The Past, The Present, The Future is the sixth album released by Mark 'Oh, and it was released on November 20, 2009, by ZYX Music.

The album contains two cover songs, a cover of the song "Scatman", released by Scatman John in 1994., and a cover of "United", released by Prince Ital Joe feat Marky Mark in 1994.

The album also contains three of Mark 'Oh's old songs: Randy (Never Stop That Feeling), Mark 'Oh's first single, released in 1993., Tears Don't Lie released by Mark 'Oh in 1994., and Your Love released by Mark 'Oh in 1999.

Track listing

Album credits
All songs on The Past, The Present, The Future are produced by The OH Corporation except where noted.

Scatman (produced by Mark 'Oh and Tobias Schlechtrimen)
Music and Words By: John Larkin and Antonio Nunzio Catania
Don't Leave Me
Vocals By: Ryan Bowden
Written By: The OH Corporation
Bomb
Vocals By: A Girl & K-Star
Written By:The OH Corporation
Co-Produced By: Ilan Schulz
7 Days A Week
Vocals By: Another Girl
Written By:The OH Corporation
Co-Produced By: Ilan Schulz
United (produced by Mark 'Oh and Tobias Schlechtrimen)
Music By: Alex Christensen, Frank Peterson
Lyrics By: Alex Christensen, Frank Peterson, Mark Wahlberg, Joseph Paquette
La La
Vocals By: Turkey Rhubarb
Written By: The OH Corporation
Flash and Thunder
Vocals By: Ryan Bowden
Written By: The OH Corporation
Randy (Never Stop That Feeling) (produced by Mark 'Oh and Gery Bokoe)
Written By: Mark 'Oh and Gery Bokoe
Tears Don't Lie (produced by Mark 'Oh and Holger Scheiker )
Music By: Mark 'Oh, Dario Baldan Bembo, Ciro Dammicco
Words By: Mark 'Oh, Francesco Speccia, Alberto Salerno, Maurizio Seymandi
Your Love (produced by Mark 'Oh and Claus Hagele)
Vocals By: John Davies 
Music By: Mark 'Oh and Claus Hagele
Words By: Bruce Hammond Earlam

References

External links

2009 albums
Marko Albrecht albums